(Sugar) Jackson Osei Bonsu (born 3 March 1981, in Ghana) is a Belgian welterweight professional boxer of Ghanaian descent. He started to call himself Sugar as a reference to Sugar Ray Robinson.  Jackson has, in recent times, gained a large following in the UK and US, and in early 2008 was voted the 'Official Overseas Fighter' of internet boxing forum Boxing Rebels, replacing the charismatic Bobby Gunn.

In 1997, Jackson came to Belgium, where his father was already living. As boxing was his boyhood dream, he started to attend the Antwerpse Boksschool (English: Antwerp Boxing School). Currently, Jackson trains in Izegem.

Sugar Jackson is famous for his punching and his perseverance. His defence and technique are considered his weaker points. So far, Jackson has won 40 (28 knockouts) of his 45 fights. In February 2005, he won the IBC world title. In February 2007, almost exactly two years after his IBC title, Jackson defeated Nordin Mouchi, capturing the EBU European title. He successfully defended his EBU title 4 times. The last time was on 3 May 2008 against the Ukrainian Viktor Plotnikov.

On 14 September 2008 Jackson lost his EBU Welterweight title in a greatly disputed unanimous decision against Rafał Jackiewicz. Although all three judges scored the fight in favour of Jackiewicz, there was great controversy as many experts believed Sugar Jackson won at least 10 of the 12 rounds. Belgian newspaper De Standaard called the result 'the theft of the century'.

Boxing record

See also
Expeditie Robinson 2010

References

External links
 Sugar Jackson Official Website 
 Sugar Jackson Fanpage 
 

Living people
1981 births
Welterweight boxers
Ghanaian emigrants to Belgium
Belgian male boxers
Black Belgian sportspeople